Peder Gustav Björk (born 1975) is a Swedish politician and member of the Riksdag, the national legislature. A member of the Social Democratic Party, he has represented Västernorrland County since September 2022. He had previously been a member of the municipal council in Sundsvall Municipality.

References

1975 births
Living people
Members of the Riksdag 2022–2026
Members of the Riksdag from the Social Democrats
People from Sundsvall Municipality